John J. Salka is an American politician and respiratory therapist from the state of New York. A Republican, Salka has represented the 121st district of the New York State Assembly, based in Madison and Otsego Counties, since 2019.

Career
Salka has worked as a respiratory therapist for 30 years, currently serving as the director of cardiopulmonary services at Community Memorial Hospital in Hamilton.

Electoral history
Salka was elected as Brookfield Town Supervisor in 2007, a position he held until 2018.

In 2014, Salka ran for the New York State Assembly's 121st district, challenging long-serving incumbent Democrat William Magee. Salka lost, 53-47%. He ran again against Magee in 2016, losing by a slightly narrower margin of 52-48%.

Salka announced a third run for the Assembly in 2018, this time defeating Magee 51-49%. He took office on January 9, 2019.

Personal life
Salka lives in Brookfield with his wife Erin. They have two children; their daughter, Emily, died in 2015.

References

Living people
People from Brookfield, New York
Town supervisors in New York (state)
Republican Party members of the New York State Assembly
21st-century American politicians
1954 births